Adelaide city centre (Kaurna: Tarndanya) is the inner city locality of Greater Adelaide, the capital city of South Australia. It is known by locals simply as "the City" or "Town" to distinguish it from Greater Adelaide and from the City of Adelaide local government area (which also includes North Adelaide and from the Park Lands around the whole city centre).

Adelaide city centre was planned in 1837 on a greenfield site following a grid layout, with streets running at right angles to each other. Within the city are five parks: Victoria Square in the exact centre and four other, smaller parks. 

Names for elements of the city centre are as follows:
The "city square mile" (in reality 1.67 square miles or 4.33 square kilometres) is the constructed area bordered by North, East, South and West Terraces. 
The "central business district" (CBD) is an alternative term, but more accurately describes the intensively developed northern half of the city, which contains a multitude of commercial, cultural and entertainment premises, restaurants and high-rise apartments. The southern, lower-density half mainly contains small businesses, restaurants and, residentially, a mix of mansions, houses and conserved 19th century cottages, and (fewer) high-rise apartments. 
Precincts such as the West End and the East End have distinctive characters. CBD shopping precincts include Rundle Mall and Adelaide Central Market.
In what is often described as the "North Terrace cultural precinct", many educational, cultural, entertainment and medical institutions lie between the northern side of North Terrace and the River Torrens – notably university campuses, the Adelaide Festival Centre, and the Parliament of South Australia. The Adelaide Railway Station is also located there.

History 

Before the British colonisation of South Australia, the Adelaide Plains, on which Adelaide was built, were home to the Kaurna group of Aboriginal Australians. The colony of South Australia was established in 1836 at Glenelg, and the city itself established in 1837. The location and characteristic grid layout of the city and North Adelaide, as well as the surrounding parklands, were the result of the work of Colonel William Light (1786–1839), who was the first Surveyor General of South Australia. The area where the Adelaide city centre now exists was once known as "Tarndanya", the Kaurna word for as "male red kangaroo rock", which was the name used for an area along the south bank of what is now known as the River Torrens (Karrawiri Pari), which flows through Adelaide.

Adelaide was not as badly affected by the 1860s economic depression in Australia as other gold rush cities like Sydney and Melbourne, allowing it to prosper. Historian F.W. Crowley noted that the city was full of elite upper-class citizens which provided a stark contrast to the grinding poverty of the labour areas and slums outside the inner city ring. Due to its historic wealth during the 20th century, the city retains a notable portion of Victorian architecture.

Town planning

Adelaide is separated from its greater metropolitan area by a ring of public parklands on all sides. The so-called "square mile" within the park lands is defined by a small area of high rise office and apartment buildings in the centre north, around King William Street, which runs north-to-south through the centre. Surrounding this central business district are a large number of medium to low density apartments, townhouses and detached houses which make up the residential portion of the city centre.

Layout 

The layout of Adelaide, sometimes referred to as "Light's Vision", features a cardinal direction grid pattern of wide streets and terraces and five large public squares: Victoria Square in the centre of the city, and Hindmarsh, Light, Hurtle and Whitmore Squares in the centres of each of the four quadrants of the Adelaide city centre.  These squares occupy 32 of the 700 numbered "town acre" allotments on Light's plan.

All east–west roads change their names as they cross King William Street, except for North and South terraces. They also alternate between being wide and narrow, except for the central Grote and Wakefield which are extra-wide, along with the surrounding four terraces. In the south half of the city, in several places the Adelaide City Council has constructed wide footpaths and road markings to restrict traffic to a lesser number of lanes than the full width of the road could support.

The street pairs, design widths, and town acres in Light's Vision are illustrated in this diagram:

Street and square names 

The streets and squares were named by a committee of a number of prominent settlers after themselves, after early directors of the South Australian Company, after Colonisation Commissioners of South Australia (appointed by the British government to oversee implementation of the acts that established the colony), and after various notables involved in the establishment of the colony.

The Street Naming Committee comprised:

All members of the committee (except Stephens) had one or more of the streets and squares in the Adelaide city centre and North Adelaide named after themselves. Brown Street, named for John Brown, was subsequently subsumed as a continuation of Morphett Street in 1967. In the same year, Hanson Street, named for Richard Hanson, was subsumed as a continuation of Pulteney Street.

The squares were named after:
Victoria - the regent, Princess Victoria, later Queen Victoria
Hindmarsh - Rear Admiral Sir John Hindmarsh, first Governor of South Australia 
Hurtle - Sir James Hurtle Fisher, first Resident Commissioner
Light - Colonel William Light, Surveor General 
Whitmore - William Wolryche-Whitmore MP, a Colonial Commissioner in London
The east–west streets named on 22 December 1836 were:
Rundle – John Rundle MP, Director of the South Australian Company
Hindley – Charles Hindley MP, Director of South Australian Company
Grenfell – Pascoe St Leger Grenfell MP, presented town acre for Holy Trinity Church and other country lands
Currie – Raikes Currie MP, Director of South Australian Company
Pirie – Sir John Pirie, alderman and later Lord Mayor of London, Director of South Australian Company
Waymouth – Henry Waymouth, Director South Australian Company
Flinders – Matthew Flinders, explorer
Franklin – Rear Admiral Sir John Franklin, midshipman under Flinders
Wakefield – Daniel Bell Wakefield, barrister who drafted the South Australia Act
Grote – George Grote MP, treasurer of the South Australia Association
Angas – George Fife Angas, a Colonial Commissioner and founding Chairman of Directors of the South Australian Company
Gouger – Robert Gouger, first Colonial Secretary
Most of these people did not reside in or visit South Australia.

The naming of the streets was completed on 23 May 1837 and gazetted on 3 June.

East–west streets: 
Carrington - John Abel Smith (Lord Carrington)
Wright - John Wright, Colonial Commissioner and financier
Halifax - Charles Wood, 1st Viscount Halifax, Chancellor of the Exchequer
Sturt - Charles Sturt, explorer
Gilles - Osmond Gilles, early treasurer of the colony
Gilbert - Thomas Gilbert, storekeeper and postmaster
North–south streets:
Morphett - John Morphett, member of the South Australian parliament
Pulteney - Admiral Sir Pulteney Malcolm, British naval officer
Hutt - William Hutt MP, a Colonial Commissioner

Dual naming of squares and parklands
The Adelaide City Council began the process of dual naming all of the city squares, each of the parks making up the parklands which surround the city centre and North Adelaide, and other sites of significance to the Kaurna people in 1997. The naming process, which assigned an extra name in the Kaurna language to each place, was mostly completed in 2003, and the renaming of 39 sites finalised and endorsed by the council in 2012.
Victoria Square - Tarntanyangga ('red kangaroo dreaming')
Hindmarsh Square - Mukata
Hurtle Square - Tangkaira
Light Square - Wauwi
Whitmore Square - Iparrityi

20th-21st century precincts

The City of Adelaide Council has defined a number of neighbourhood precincts in the city centre, each with a character of their own:
The East End, centering on Rundle Street - known for its restaurants, bars, high-end fashion shops, the Palace Nova Cinema;
The West End, from the western end of North Terrace and encompassing several blocks southward, which includes UniSA "CityWest" campus, the Samstag Museum of Art, JamFactory, Lion Arts Centre, Mercury Cinema, numerous bars, clubs and restaurants, and "BioMed City";
The South East of the city, largely residential, but including many cafés, restaurants, pubs, etc.; and
The South West is very diverse; largely residential and including the Adelaide Central Market

In addition to these, the north-eastern side of North Terrace is often referred to as the "North Terrace cultural precinct" or "cultural boulevard", and includes the Art Gallery of South Australia, the State Library of South Australia, the South Australian Museum, the Migration Museum, the Adelaide Botanic Garden, the University of Adelaide and the "CityEast" campus of the UniSA

Demographics
The population was 15,115 in the 2016 census in the Adelaide city centre, 38.8 percent born in Australia. The next most common countries of birth were China 17.5%, Malaysia 4.4%, England 3.4%, Hong Kong 2.8% and India 1.9%. 44.6% of people spoke only English at home. Other languages spoken at home included Mandarin 19.6%, Cantonese 4.9%, Arabic 1.9%, Korean 1.9% and Vietnamese 1.1%. The most common response for religion in Adelaide was 'No Religion' at 47.7% of the population.

Politics 
At federal level, Adelaide is within the Division of Adelaide, a marginal seat which historically has alternated between the Liberal and Labor parties. It has been held since 2019 by Steve Georganas of the Labor party.

In the South Australian House of Assembly, Adelaide is within the Electoral district of Adelaide. Since the March 2022 state election, the seat has been held by Lucy Hood of the Labor party.

Culture

Adelaide's cultural and entertainment precincts/venues are generally concentrated in the city centre. They include the Convention Centre, Entertainment Centre and the redeveloped Adelaide Oval. Additionally, most of the events relating to the Adelaide Festival and Adelaide Fringe are held within Adelaide's city centre during February and March. This time is known as "Mad March", due to the large number of other cultural festivities at the same time, including the Adelaide 500 and WOMADelaide. North Terrace is considered Adelaide's "cultural boulevard" because of its tight concentration of galleries and museums.

Gallery

See also 
Adelaide (Greater Adelaide metropolis)
City of Adelaide (local government area)
North Adelaide
Street art in Adelaide
Grid layout

Notes

References

Select bibliography

Further reading

Suburbs of Adelaide
Central business districts in Australia
Economy of Adelaide